is a retired Japanese athlete who specialized in the 400 metres hurdles and occasionally the 400 metres.

He teaches sports at Hosei University.

Personal bests

Records
4×400 m relay
Former Japanese university record holder - 3:07.51 s (relay leg: 4th) (Tokyo, 19 May 1991)
400 metres (Indoor)
Former Asian record holder - 45.76 s (Paris, 9 March 1997)
Current Japanese record holder - 45.76 s (Paris, 9 March 1997)
4×400 m relay (Indoor)
Current Asian and Japanese record holder - 3:05.90 s (relay leg: 4th) (Maebashi, 6 March 1999)

 with Kazuhiro Takahashi, Jun Osakada, and Masayoshi Kan

International competition record

National championships
He has won the individual national championship 3 times.
 1 win in the 400 metres (1993)
 2 wins in the 400 metres hurdles (1994, 1997)

References

External links
 
 
 Official blog

1969 births
Living people
Sportspeople from Yokohama
Japanese male hurdlers
Japanese male sprinters
Olympic male hurdlers
Olympic male sprinters
Olympic athletes of Japan
Athletes (track and field) at the 1996 Summer Olympics
Athletes (track and field) at the 2000 Summer Olympics
Asian Games gold medalists for Japan
Asian Games medalists in athletics (track and field)
Athletes (track and field) at the 1994 Asian Games
Athletes (track and field) at the 1998 Asian Games
Medalists at the 1994 Asian Games
Medalists at the 1998 Asian Games
World Athletics Championships athletes for Japan
World Athletics Indoor Championships medalists
Japan Championships in Athletics winners
Academic staff of Hosei University
20th-century Japanese people
21st-century Japanese people